Union councils of Panchagarh District are the smallest rural administrative and local government units in Panchagarh District of Bangladesh. The district consists of 2 municipalities, 5 upazilas, 5 thana, 41 ward, 121 mahalla, 43 union porishods, mouza 463 and 825 villages.

Atwari Upazila
Atwari Upazila is divided into six union parishads. The union parishads are subdivided into 62 mauzas and 64 villages.

 Alowakhowa Union
 Balarampur Union
 Dhamor Union
 Mirzapur Union
 Radhanagar Union
 Toria Union

Boda Upazila
Boda Upazila is divided into Boda Municipality and ten union parishads. The union parishads are subdivided into 174 mauzas and 219 villages. Boda Municipality is subdivided into 9 wards and 32 mahallas.

 Benghari Banagram Union
 Boda Union
 Boroshoshi Union
 Chandanbari Union
 Jholaishal Shiri Union
 Kajoldighi Kaligonj Union 
 Marea Bamonhat Union
 Moidan Dighi Union
 Pachpir Union
 Sakoa Union

Debiganj Upazila
Debiganj Upazila is divided into ten union parishads. The union parishads are subdivided into 108 mauzas and 101 villages.
 Chengthi Hazradanga Union
 Chilahati Union 
 Dandopal Union
 Debiduba Union
 Debiganj Union
 Pamuli Union
 Shaldanga Union
 Sonahar Mollikadaha Union
 Sundardighi Union
 Tepriganj Union

Panchagarh Sadar Upazila
Panchagarh Sadar Upazila is divided into Panchagarh Municipality and ten union parishads. The union parishads are subdivided into 83 mauzas and 195 villages. Panchagarh Municipality is subdivided into 9 wards and 32 mahallas.

 Amarkhana Union
 Chaklahat Union
 Dhakkamara Union
 Garinabari Union
 Hafizabad Union
 Haribhasa Union
 Kamat Kajal Dighi Union
 Magura Union
 Panchagarh Union
 Satmara Union

Tetulia Upazila
Tetulia Upazila is divided into seven union parishads. The union parishads are subdivided into 36 mauzas and 246 villages.

 Banglabandha Union
 Bhajanpur Union
 Buraburi Union
 Devnagar Union
 Shalbahan Union
 Tetulia Union
 Tirnaihat Union

References 

Local government in Bangladesh